Henry Sharp was an American cinematographer who worked in Hollywood from the 1920s through the 1950s. He was known for his work with actor Douglas Fairbanks.

Biography 
Sharp was born in Los Angeles, California, to Thomas Sharp and Charlotte Bailey. He began working as a cinematographer by 1920, and by 1930, had become Douglas Fairbanks' cameraman of choice. He accompanied the star on a trip around the world, filing their travels. He survived a plane crash in 1935 in Missouri, although he was left in the hospital for three months. After he recovered, he married his nurse, Jean Thayer.

Selected filmography

 Homespun Folks (1920)
 The Hottentot (1922)
 The Third Alarm (1922)
 Soul of the Beast (1923)
 Judgment of the Storm (1924)
 The Marriage Cheat (1924)
 A Girl of the Limberlost (1924)
 Barbara Frietchie (1924)
 While the City Sleeps (1928)
 Brotherly Love (1928)
 The Sins of the Children (1930)
 The Strange Case of Clara Deane (1932)
 The Devil Is Driving (1932)
 Song of the Eagle (1933)
 The Lemon Drop Kid (1934)
 The Accusing Finger (1936)
 Campus Confessions (1938)
 His Exciting Night (1938)
 Sudden Money (1939)
 Dr. Cyclops (1940)
 Broadway Limited (1941)
 Henry Aldrich, Editor (1942)
 The Hidden Hand (1942)
 The Mysterious Doctor (1943)
 Ministry of Fear (1944)
 National Barn Dance (1944)
 Tomorrow, the World! (1944)
 The Man in Half Moon Street (1945)
 What Next, Corporal Hargrove? (1945)
 Woman Who Came Back (1945)
 The Glass Alibi (1946)
 The Fabulous Suzanne (1946)
 It Happened on Fifth Avenue (1947)
 High Tide (1947)
 Perilous Waters (1948)
 Strike It Rich (1948)
 Daughter of the West (1949)
 The Lawton Story (1949)
 Wonder Valley (1953)
 The Young Land (1959)

References 

American cinematographers
1892 births
1966 deaths
People from Los Angeles